= Turkish Marine Research Foundation =

Turkish research foundation

- Website: tudav.org/en

The Turkish Marine Research Foundation is a foundation researching the Aegean, Marmara, Mediterranean and Black Seas.
